The Japan Center is a shopping center in the Japantown neighborhood of San Francisco, California.  It opened in March 1968 and was originally called the Japanese Cultural and Trade Center. It is bounded by Geary (on the south), Post (on the north), Fillmore (on the west), and Laguna (on the east). The mall itself is composed of three mall buildings; from west to east, they are the Kinokuniya Mall, Kintetsu Mall (now Japan Center West), and Miyako Mall (now Japan Center East). Anchor tenants include Books Kinokuniya and Sundance Kabuki Cinema.

History
The San Francisco Board of Supervisors designated what became Area A-1 of the Western Addition Project (WAP A-1), a  parcel, as a redevelopment project in August 1948. In total, 8,000 residents were displaced from this area, which was acquired by the San Francisco Redevelopment Agency (SFRA) starting in the late 1950s under eminent domain. The mall was developed by National-Braemar, who were joined by Kintetsu Enterprises Company of America (wholly owned by the Kinki Nippon Railway) in 1962. Construction of the mall began in 1965. In 1966, Herman told The New York Times "We set out four or five years ago to try and crystallize and preserve the special cultural and social values of San Francisco, which in time tend to be lost and dissipated." Mayor Joseph Alioto dedicated the mall at its opening.

The initial tenants included the manufacturers Hitachi, Nissan, and Mitsubishi, who used their showroom spaces to demonstrate electronics and automobiles; Kikkoman International; the 15-story Miyako Hotel; and Books Kinokuniya. The mall was renamed Japan Center by 1970, and by the mid-70s, retailers had displaced manufacturers as consumers had become familiar with Japanese electronics and cars.

In 2009, ownership of the buildings and spaces was divided between:
 Kabuki Sundance Theater (1881 Post), owned by Japan Center Kabuki I LLC, c/o 3D Investments
 Kinokuniya Building (1825 Post), owned by Kinokuniya Book Stores of America
 Kintetsu Mall (11 Peace Plaza), owned by Kintetsu Enterprises Company of America
 Peace Plaza, owned by San Francisco, Recreation and Parks Department
 Miyako Mall (22 Peace Plaza), owned by Union Bank of California
 Hotel Kabuki (1625 Post), owned by Japan Center Hotel Associates, c/o 3D Investments

By 2020, 3D Investments had bought the former Kintetsu Mall and Miyako Mall, now called Japan Center West and Japan Center East respectively.

Due to the COVID-19 pandemic in the United States across San Francisco Bay Area in Northern California, businesses in Japan Center have been described as struggling to survive. According to a lawyer for the tenants, some had lost as much as $17,000 per month, and 3D Investments had not been forgiving to its tenants, while at Kinokuniya Inc., "no one is responding."

Shops and restaurants
The Fuki-ya restaurant owned by Junko and Richard K. Diran is said to have been the first Robatayaki restaurant in the United States.

Hotel
The hotel, anchoring the east end of the super-block, was originally constructed by the Kinki Nippon Railway and operated by the Western Hotels Company as the Miyako Hotel. The Miyako originally occupied the 15-story tower, and the 4-story building to the east of the tower, which originally housed the Consulate General of Japan, was later incorporated into the hotel property.

Design and features
The Japan Center complex occupies  of land and the construction budget was $15 million.

The architecture of the site, created by Minoru Yamasaki, has been described as "Brutalist slabwork." Van Bourg/Nakamura drafted the plans for Japan Center. It uses contemporary forms and materials and is inspired by traditional Japanese architectural features. The interiors of the mall buildings were designed by Takenaka & Associates of Osaka to evoke narrow Japanese streets, as shop facades include decorative glazed tile roofs and pillars; the interiors also include large public areas with natural lighting. Structural steel for the Bridge of Shops was supplied by U.S. Steel, American Bridge Division in South San Francisco, California.

San Francisco's Peace Pagoda is on the Japan Center site. The Peace Plaza was originally designed by Japanese architect Yoshirō Taniguchi, and an update in 2000 by Kenji Murokami removed a large covered walkway on the north side (connecting Japan Center West and East). The Peace Plaza was rededicated by Mayor Willie Brown in 2003.

Gallery

References

External links

 

Japanese-American culture in San Francisco
Japantowns in the United States
Shopping districts and streets in the San Francisco Bay Area
Shopping malls established in 1968
Buildings and structures completed in 1968
1968 establishments in California
20th century in San Francisco
Minoru Yamasaki buildings
Modernist architecture in California
Shopping malls in San Francisco